Žďár nad Orlicí is a municipality and village in Rychnov nad Kněžnou District in the Hradec Králové Region of the Czech Republic. It has about 500 inhabitants.

Administrative parts
Villages of Chotiv and Světlá are administrative parts of Žďár nad Orlicí.

History
The first written mention of Žďár nad Orlicí is from 1342.

References

Villages in Rychnov nad Kněžnou District